Campbell is a city in Hunt County, in the U.S. state of Texas. The population was 638 at the 2010 census, down from 734 at the 2000 census.

Geography
Campbell is in eastern Hunt County. Texas State Highway 24 runs through the northwest side of the city, and the city limits extend southward from downtown to include Interstate 30, which has access from exits 101 and 104. I-30 leads west  to Greenville, the Hunt county seat, and east  to Sulphur Springs, while Highway 24 leads northeast  to Commerce.

History
The town was established in 1880 and was named for postmaster general and future Texas governor Thomas Mitchell Campbell.

Demographics

As of the 2020 United States census, there were 542 people, 355 households, and 258 families residing in the city.

Education
The city is served by the Campbell Independent School District, home of the Indians.  The high school's athletes participate in such sports as six-man football, tennis, basketball, baseball, softball, track and field, golf, and cross-country sprinting.

References

Dallas–Fort Worth metroplex
Cities in Texas
Cities in Hunt County, Texas